Vazir Sultan Tobacco Colts XI and Vazir Sultan Tobacco XI were two first-class cricket teams, sponsored by the Indian company Vazir Sultan Tobacco, that competed in the Moin-ud-Dowlah Gold Cup Tournament in the 1960s and 1970s.

Vazir Sultan Tobacco Colts XI
Sunil Gavaskar, who made his first-class debut for the Vazir Sultan Tobacco Colts XI in 1966-67 at the age of 17, recalls that the team consisted of young cricketers "who were doing well at school and inter-university level. We used to have the odd first-class player, but generally it was a team of young players trying to make their mark in first-class cricket in India." 

The team played their first match in 1964-65, under the captaincy of the Test captain at the time, the Nawab of Pataudi. He also captained the team in 1965-66 and 1966-67, when the team played one match each time. Pataudi scored three centuries: one in each match. In 1964-65 Ramnath Parkar made his first-class debut, in 1965-66 Eknath Solkar, and in 1966-67 Mohinder Amarnath, at 16, made his first-class debut alongside Gavaskar. All three matches were drawn, with Vazir Sultan Tobacco Colts XI conceding the first-innings lead.

In 1967-68, now captained by Ambar Roy, Vazir Sultan Tobacco Colts XI beat Hyderabad Cricket Association XI and Hyderabad Blues to proceed to the semi-final against State Bank of India, which ended with the scores level and State Bank of India 57 for 7. In 1968-69 they again reached the semi-final, this time losing a match outright for the first time, to State Bank of India; Dilip Doshi was among those making their first-class debuts.

Srinivasaraghavan Venkataraghavan captained a side of nine first-class debutants in 1969-70, and Bharath Reddy, aged 18 and making his own first-class debut, captained a side of ten first-class debutants in 1973-74. However, apart from Reddy himself, none of these debutants went on to play Test cricket.

In all, Vazir Sultan Tobacco Colts XI played 10 first-class matches, winning two, losing two, and drawing six.

Vazir Sultan Tobacco XI
In contrast to the emphasis on youth of the Colts XI, when the Vazir Sultan Tobacco XI played their first matches in 1970-71 their team included seven Test players, of whom Salim Durani, Vijay Manjrekar and Chandu Borde were in their late thirties. The selection policy changed slightly in 1971-72, when three players made their first-class debuts under the captaincy of Venkataraghavan.

They won their first match, against Mafatlal Sports Club, and drew their other four matches between 1970-71 and 1972-73.

Other teams
Vazir Sultan Tobacco has sometimes sponsored teams in the Moin-ud-Dowlah Gold Cup Tournament since the tournament lost its first-class status after the 1973-74 season, as well as in other non-first-class competitions.

References

External links
First-class matches played by Vazir Sultan Tobacco Colts XI at CricketArchive
First-class matches played by Vazir Sultan Tobacco XI at CricketArchive

Indian first-class cricket teams
Former senior cricket clubs of India